Camilla Barungi is an Ugandan fashion/runway model who was born on 1981. She is also a New York-based fashion model, social innovator, cultural & business strategist.

Work experience 

As a strategist, Camilla leverages innovation and cultural bridges to foster job creation and the growth of Africa and the African Diaspora's innovation ecosystems in line with the UN Sustainable Development Goal (SDGs).

As a university student in Silicon Valley, Camilla was discovered by a fashion agent and has since worked as an international model for renowned luxury designers such as Giorgio Armani, Ralph Lauren, Escada, Oscar de la Renta, Tommy Hilfiger, Tiffany's and is also remembered for her standout appearance in Season 3 of the Emmy Award-winning Project Runway show.

She went on to work with a number of initiatives focused on meeting the United Nation's Sustainable Development Goals in particular as they relate to fashion. At the 2015 United Nations NGO Conference she curated and moderated a panel on Sustainable fashion and Global Development -”Conversations about sustainable fashion and design and the role that technology and innovation can play to ignite a global social impact. How consumers and technology can play a role in impacting ethical sourcing in developing countries. “

On August 27, 2015, she addressed the United Nations on including Sustainable Fashion in their implementation of the Sustainable Development Goals (SDGs) as part of the proposal for the 2030 Agenda for Sustainable Development. In 2019, she spoke at a similar event organized at the United Nations by the permanent mission of Sweden to the UN.

She is head of women's affairs for the Uganda Tennis Association.

Innovations 
Camilla launched her first entrepreneurial venture in 2008 working with women's co-ops in East Africa producing sustainable ingredients to supply the global beauty industry. She has since scaled her social enterprise as a founder of Alliance 4 Development (A4D) a global advisory incubator accelerating innovation ecosystems at the intersection of sustainable fashion, emerging technologies, impact film and smart manufacturing.  Some of A4D's clients include Herflix, Encantos Media in the United States and Uganda Federation of Movie Industries, The Kingdom of Tooro, Pangea Under The Stars Film Festival, Viewer's Choice Movie Awards and Uganda Tourism Board in Africa.

Camilla and philanthropy 
Camilla also devotes her time and donates her strategic advisory services for philanthropy that drives diversity and inclusion for underserved communities; as a board member for Geeks Rule; a provider of STEM education to underserved students, The Nyaka Aids Orphan Project serving 650 students and as co-chair for ADAPT Community Network's Santa Project Party for over decade, a provider of cutting edge programs and services for people living with disabilities in the United States.

Education background 
Camila is a former student at a San Jose State University in Silicon Valley where she studied biochemistry.

References

1981 births
Living people
Ugandan models
Ugandan businesspeople